Andrei Nechita (born 29 May 1988 in Vaslui) is a Romanian former professional road racing cyclist, who rode professionally between 2014 and 2016 for the  and  teams.

Major results

2006
 9th Trofeo San Rocco
2008
 2nd Road race, National Road Championships
 7th Trofeo Alcide Degasperi
 8th Road race, UEC European Under-23 Road Championships
2009
 1st  Road race, National Under-23 Road Championships
2010
 National Road Championships
1st  Road race
1st  Under-23 road race
 3rd Coppa della Pace
 4th Trofeo Alcide Degasperi
2011
 National Road Championships
1st  Road race
1st  Time trial
 1st  Overall Tour of Romania
2012
 1st  Time trial, National Road Championships
 Tour of Szeklerland
1st Points classification
1st Stage 4b
 5th Overall Tour of Trakya
 5th Overall Tour of Romania
 9th Memorial Davide Fardelli
2013
 National Road Championships
1st  Road race
1st  Time trial
 5th Overall Tour of Szeklerland
1st  Romanian rider classification
 5th Coppa della Pace
2014
 National Road Championships
1st  Time trial
2nd Road race
2015
 National Road Championships
3rd Road race
3rd Time trial
 7th Overall Black Sea Cycling Tour
 8th Overall Tour of Szeklerland
 10th Overall Tour of Małopolska
2016
 1st Prologue Sibiu Cycling Tour

References

External links

1988 births
Living people
Sportspeople from Vaslui
Romanian male cyclists
Road racing cyclists
Cyclists at the 2012 Summer Olympics
Olympic cyclists of Romania
Cyclists at the 2015 European Games
European Games competitors for Romania
20th-century Romanian people
21st-century Romanian people